Kirill Lebedev (born October 1, 1991) is a Russian professional ice hockey forward who is currently an unrestricted free agent. He most recently played for Neftyanik Almetievsk of the Supreme Hockey League (VHL).

Lebedev made his KHL debut with Metallurg Magnitogorsk in the 2010–11 season.

References

External links

1991 births
Living people
Indiana Ice players
HC Kunlun Red Star players
HC Sibir Novosibirsk players
HC Sochi players
KRS Heilongjiang players
Metallurg Magnitogorsk players
Metallurg Novokuznetsk players
Russian ice hockey forwards
People from Magnitogorsk
Sportspeople from Chelyabinsk Oblast